In the mathematical field of real analysis, Lusin's theorem (or Luzin's theorem, named for Nikolai Luzin) or Lusin's criterion states that an almost-everywhere finite function is measurable if and only if it is a continuous function on nearly all its domain. In the informal formulation of J. E. Littlewood, "every measurable function is nearly continuous".

Classical statement
For an interval [a, b], let

be a measurable function. Then, for every ε > 0, there exists a compact E ⊆ [a, b] such that f restricted to E is continuous and

Note that E inherits the subspace topology from [a, b]; continuity of f restricted to E is defined using this topology.

Also for any function f, defined on the interval [a, b] and almost-everywhere finite, if for any ε > 0 there is a function ϕ, continuous on [a, b], such that the measure of the set

is less than ε, then f is measurable.

General form
Let  be a Radon measure space and Y be a second-countable topological space equipped with a Borel algebra, and let  be a measurable function.

On the proof

The proof of Lusin's theorem can be found in many classical books. Intuitively, one expects it as a consequence of Egorov's theorem and density of smooth functions. Egorov's theorem states that pointwise convergence is nearly uniform, and uniform convergence preserves continuity.

References
Sources
 N. Lusin. Sur les propriétés des fonctions mesurables, Comptes rendus de l'Académie des Sciences de Paris 154 (1912), 1688–1690.
 G. Folland. Real Analysis: Modern Techniques and Their Applications, 2nd ed. Chapter 7
 W. Zygmunt. Scorza-Dragoni property (in Polish), UMCS, Lublin, 1990
 M. B. Feldman, "A Proof of Lusin's Theorem", American Math. Monthly, 88 (1981), 191-2
 Lawrence C. Evans, Ronald F. Gariepy, "Measure Theory and fine properties of functions", CRC Press Taylor & Francis Group, Textbooks in  mathematics, Theorem 1.14
Citations

Theorems in real analysis
Theorems in measure theory
Articles containing proofs